Live is the first live album by singer-songwriter James Taylor released on August 10, 1993 by Columbia Records. The double album presents selections from 14 shows during a November 1992 tour. In the US, Live peaked at number 20 on the Billboard 200 chart and has sold more than one million copies, being certified 2× platinum by the RIAA.

A single-album CD of highlights of the double album was also released, titled Best Live. There are two different versions of this album; a 17-track version was released in 1993, and a shorter 12-track version on June 21, 1994. On digital distributors such as Spotify and iTunes, many of the verbal introductions that were present in the original CD have been cut.

Track listing
All songs by James Taylor except where noted.

Disc one
"Sweet Baby James" – 4:13
"Traffic Jam" – 2:10
"Handy Man" (Otis Blackwell, Jimmy Jones) – 3:31
"Your Smiling Face" – 3:03
"Secret O' Life" – 3:45
"Shed a Little Light" – 4:32
"Everybody Has the Blues" – 2:33
"Steamroller Blues" – 5:30
"Mexico" – 3:32
"Millworker" – 4:25
"Country Road" – 5:44
"Fire and Rain" – 4:44
"Shower the People" – 4:43
"How Sweet It Is (To Be Loved by You)" (Holland, Dozier, Holland) – 7:29
"New Hymn" (Reynolds Price, Taylor) – 3:00

Disc two
"Walking Man" – 4:35
"Riding on a Railroad" – 2:41
"Something in the Way She Moves" – 3:59
"Sun on the Moon" – 3:54
"Up on the Roof" (Gerry Goffin, Carole King) – 4:10
"Don't Let Me Be Lonely Tonight" – 3:37
"She Thinks I Still Care" (Dickey Lee) – 3:28
"Copperline" (R. Price, Taylor) – 4:43
"Slap Leather" – 2:11
"Only One" – 4:41
"You Make It Easy" – 5:05
"Carolina in My Mind" – 5:04
"I Will Follow" – 4:14
"You've Got a Friend" (King) – 5:09
"That Lonesome Road (Don Grolnick, Taylor) – 2:46

Best Live (17 track)
"Sweet Baby James" – 4:11
"Handy Man" (Blackwell, Jones) – 3:34
"Your Smiling Face" – 2:51
"Steamroller Blues" – 5:36
"Mexico" – 3:17
"Walking Man" – 4:08
"Country Road" – 5:44
"Fire and Rain" – 4:33
"How Sweet It Is (To Be Loved By You)" (Holland, Dozier, Holland) – 6:57
"Riding on a Railroad" – 2:42
"Something in the Way She Moves" – 3:59
"Sun on the Moon" – 3:51
"Up on the Roof" (Goffin, King) – 4:13
"Copperline" (Price, Taylor) – 4:40
"Slap Leather" – 2:14
"You've Got a Friend" (King) – 5:09
"That Lonesome Road" (Grolnick, Taylor) – 2:46

Best Live (12 track)
"Sweet Baby James" – 4:13
"Handy Man" (Blackwell, Jones) – 3:34
"Your Smiling Face" – 2:53
"Shed a Little Light" – 4:17
"Steamroller Blues" – 5:24
"Mexico" – 3:15
"Walking Man" – 4:23
"Country Road" – 5:38
"Fire and Rain" – 4:39
"How Sweet It Is (To Be Loved By You)" (Holland, Dozier, Holland) – 6:58
"Don't Let Me Be Lonely Tonight" – 3:10
"Shower the People" – 5:12

Personnel 
 James Taylor – lead vocals, acoustic guitar
 Michael Landau – electric guitars
 Don Grolnick – acoustic piano
 Clifford Carter – keyboards
 Jimmy Johnson – bass guitar
 Carlos Vega – drums
 Valerie Carter – backing vocals
 David Lasley – backing vocals
 Kate Markowitz – backing vocals
 Arnold McCuller – backing vocals

Production 
Studio credits
 Producers – Don Grolnick and George Massenburg
 Production co-ordination – Barbara Moutenot and Ivy Skoff
 Recorded by Nathaniel Kunkel
 Additional engineers – Rail Rogut and Michael White 
 Assistant engineer – Rail Rogut
 Mixed by George Massenburg at Electric Lady Studios (New York, NY) and Record One (Los Angeles, CA).
 Mastered by Doug Sax and Gavin Lurssen at The Mastering Lab (Hollywood, CA).

Live credits
 House sound engineer – John Godenzi
 Monitor engineer – Randy Hutson
 Technicians – Gary Epstein and Mark Hughes

Additional credits
 Art direction – Stephanie Mauer
 Photography – Andrew Brucker
 Liner notes – Peter Asher 
 Management – Peter Asher Management

References

1993 live albums
James Taylor live albums
Columbia Records live albums
Albums produced by George Massenburg